This is a complete list of the operas of the German composer Siegfried Wagner (1869–1930), the son of Richard Wagner (1813–1883).

All the opera libretti were by the composer.

List

References
Notes

Sources
Pachl, Peter P (1992), 'Wagner, Siegfried' in The New Grove Dictionary of Opera, ed. Stanley Sadie (London)

External links
International Siegfried Wagner Society

 
Lists of operas by composer
Lists of compositions by composer